Jens Andersen may refer to:

 Jens Andersen Lodehat (died 1431), Danish bishop
 Jens Andersen Beldenak (died 1537), Danish bishop
 Jens Banzon Hee Andersen (1820–1892), Danish farmer
 Jens Mathias Bollerup Andersen (1822–1868), Danish politician
 Jens Andersen (businessman) (1866–1937), Norwegian shoemaker and businessperson
 Jens Andersen (writer) (born 1955), Danish writer
 Jens Andersen (actor) (born 1971), Danish actor
 Jens Andersen (boxer) (1929–2010), Danish boxer